Serrato is a town and municipality in the province of Málaga, part of the autonomous community of Andalusia in southern Spain. It was separated from the municipality of Ronda on 19 December 2014.

References

Municipalities in the Province of Málaga